The Tamolan languages are a small family of clearly related languages spoken in the region of the Guam River in Madang Province, Papua New Guinea.

Languages
The Tamolan languages are:

Inapang (dialect continuum)
Midsivindi
Itutang (Isarikan)
Yigavesakama
Chini–Iski
Akrukay (Chini)
Iski (dialect continuum)
Romkun
Breri

Kominimung and Igana are said to also be Tamolan languages, but no data has been collected to establish that.

Tamolan is classified among the Ramu languages of northern Papua New Guinea.

Phonemes
Usher (2020) reconstructs the consonant inventory as follows:

{| 
| *m || *n ||  || *ŋ
|-
| *p || *t || *s || *k 
|-
| *mb || *nd || *ndz || *ŋg 
|-
| *w || *ɾ || *j || *ɣ
|}
Vowels are *i *ʉ *u *a.

Pronouns
Usher (2020) reconstructs the pronouns as:
{| 
! !!sg!!du!!pl
|-
!1
| *uku || *aŋgʉ || *ani
|-
!2
| *un || *uŋgʉ || *uni
|-
!3
| *an, *ma || ? || ?
|}
Plus 1sg object *na. 

Proto-Tamolan–Ataitan (Proto-Guam–Moam) is very similar, and nearly identical to Proto-Moam.

References

External links 
 Timothy Usher, New Guinea World, Proto–Guam River

 
Tamolan–Ataitan languages
Languages of Madang Province